Barbara Matić (born 3 December 1994) is a Croatian judoka. A two-time world junior champion in the women's 70 kg division, Matić won a bronze medal at the 2014 European Judo Championships. Her younger sister Brigita Matić has also been a successful judoka on junior level.

She competed at the 2016 Summer Olympics. She also competed in the women's 70 kg event at the 2020 Summer Olympics in Tokyo, Japan.

In 2020, she competed in the women's 70 kg event at the 2020 European Judo Championships held in Prague, Czech Republic. She won one of the bronze medals in her event at the 2022 Judo Grand Slam Paris held in Paris, France.

References

External links
 
 
 
 
 

1994 births
Living people
Croatian female judoka
Olympic judoka of Croatia
Judoka at the 2010 Summer Youth Olympics
Judoka at the 2016 Summer Olympics
European Games medalists in judo
European Games bronze medalists for Croatia
Judoka at the 2015 European Games
Judoka at the 2019 European Games
World judo champions
Sportspeople from Split, Croatia
Judoka at the 2020 Summer Olympics
21st-century Croatian women